St Michael's Church of England High School (formerly known as Manor High School) is a secondary school and sixth form located in Crosby, Merseyside, England. The school's missionary statement is: We will ensure that each individual is valued and achieves success within a caring Christian community.

Facilities at the school include five computer rooms (140 computers in total), a lot of interactive whiteboards, a school farm, a science department, a sports hall and a gym. There is also a sixth form for students wishing to study A-Levels. The 2022 OFSTED result was 'requires improvement'. Aspects were 'good' apart from 'leadership and management', and 'quality of teaching'. There is now an Executive Head in place, Mrs S. Aspinwall.

History
Reports in 1973 noted that the school was "underused", whereby in contrast the nearby Chesterfield High School was overcrowded. A decision was reached by the council's education committee that local primary school St. Thomas's should instead be a feeder for Manor High School to balance the load more evenly. Due to vandalism, the education committee pressed for expediency on a caretaker's house to be built on the school site.

A council report in February 1989 highlighted that areas of the school's building was in "urgent need of repair", including poorly fitted and rusted window frames, inadequate external lighting and a heating system which was not effective. The Director of Education John Marsden noted that the local authority had spent considerable sums undertaking repair and maintenance work at the school, which then accommodated around 715 pupils. The school came under criticism in June 1989 after cancelling a planned play of Our Day Out, citing concerns by parents who did not approve of the "bad language" and a scene which encouraged shop lifting. Playwright Willy Russell believed the language was only "staggeringly tame" and suggested that language used among students in the playground was likely to be more vulgar.

Building work
Work on a capital building project started on 26 November 2007 and finished in September 2008. During this time, the main hall was remodeled into a state-of-the art performing arts venue, the dining room facilities was extended and developed, and one of the entrance areas was renovated.

Phase One
This started in November 2007 and finished in April 2008; it included a new Main Hall, car park and entrance. This phase is complete and the school now has new media centre and main hall with a new floor, stage, lighting and stage curtains. The hall also has a booth in the corner to control the lighting and sound. A new car park at the front of the school was also completed and in July 2008 was extended into a disused playground, ready for the 2008 academic year.

Phase Two
This phase started on Monday 17 March 2008 finished in September 2008. This phase included the extension to the dining room. The extension of the dining room was finished and a new front car park for the school was built, along with renovations of the old dining room.

Work was completed in October 2008 and the school now has a new Arts and Media centre, extended dining room facilities and improved access to the school. They are now renovating small areas of the school. The back of the school is getting new pavement stones put down. By 2010 the school planned to have a recording studio alongside the new main hall.

Major building work started in 2011 and finished in October 2012. This included opening the disused M block as the new sixth form learning center and humanities. Other parts of the school were changed, including all new roofing and electrics and new musical facilities. Most walls in the front were plastered and all the floors were replaced. Computer rooms received new personal computers for student use.

Parts of the school 

The school is separated into five blocks joined by extremely narrow and poorly designed corridors.

P Block
P Block is on the side of the school with one side of the wall on the upper end of Manor Road. Subjects in this block include Design Technology, Food Technology, Textiles Technology, Child Development and Art. P Block is also home to the Drama Hall, which is used for assembly and (at rare occasions) to display students' art exhibitions. It also include an isolation room and pastoral support.

M Block
M Block is the three floor building near the back of the school. You can see this just above the main entrance on the picture on the right. It is used for the best Sixth Form in Sefton (on the second floor), History, Geography, Religious Studies and Modern Foreign Languages, (on the third floor) and a small dining hall (on ground floor). The dining room is also home to "student services" where students can go if they need anything.

E Block
E block is located on the far side of the school and is furthest away from the main entrance. The Year 9 & 10 & 11 office is in there. Subjects in the block include English, Mathematics, Information Communication Technology (ICT), Business Studies and Music. E block is also home to the library where students can go at break and lunch to complete homework, which opened in 2003. Also in E block are the new main hall, recording studio and media centre. E block is home to the dyslexic unit, learning support unit and the autism (ASC) base, all places are where SEN students can go for help and support with their work. It also has an isolation room.

S Block
S Block is specifically designed to teach Science, but theory animal care is also taught in there. The Year 7 & 8 office is in there. It is the newest block. The previous science block was completely destroyed in an arson attack in March 1994, started by 19-year-old Andrea Blundell who was suffering with paranoia. The cost of the damage was estimated around £1.5 million.

P.E. Block
The P.E. Block is at the right-centre of the school, while the sports hall was built on to E block when the girls school converted to a comprehensive school. The gym (which is just a big empty hall) was part of the original building, along with one set of changing rooms; those next to the sports hall were also an addition to E Block. There are offices for P.E. teachers and store rooms for equipment. Upstairs to this the is a P.E. classroom, a chapel and another changing room.

International links
The school works with the Waterloo Partnership, a local charity, by donating items such as clothes, stationery and toiletries to Peninsular Secondary School in Waterloo, Sierra Leone. In February 2007, a teacher from the school, along with other delegates from local schools and the Partnership, visited Sierra Leone. A major part of the visit was devoted to undertaking teaching in schools.

Notable former pupils
 Martyn Andrews – TV presenter, journalist and singer (previously Andrew Martin)
 Craig Phillips – winner of the first series of reality television show Big Brother

References

External links
 School website

Secondary schools in the Metropolitan Borough of Sefton
Church of England secondary schools in the Diocese of Liverpool
Academies in the Metropolitan Borough of Sefton
Crosby, Merseyside